Mercersburg Academy (formerly Marshall College and Mercersburg College) is an independent selective college-preparatory boarding and day high school in Mercersburg, Pennsylvania, in the United States. Founded in 1893, the school enrolls approximately 444 students in grades 9–12, including postgraduates, on a campus about 90 miles northwest by north of Washington, D.C.

History

On March 31, 1836, the Pennsylvania General Assembly granted a charter to Marshall College to be located in Mercersburg. Dr. Frederick Augustus Rauch came from Switzerland to be the first president of the college under the sponsorship of the Reformed Church in the United States. Dr. Rauch served as president from 1836 until 1841. His successor in the position was John Williamson Nevin, who served until 1853 when Marshall College joined with Franklin College in Lancaster, Pennsylvania, to become Franklin & Marshall College. At this time, the preparatory department of Marshall College became known as Marshall Academy, which later changed to Marshall Collegiate Institute. In 1865, the name was again changed to Mercersburg College, under whose charter the school continues to operate. The historical tie to the church continues through Mercersburg's membership in the Council for Higher Education of the United Church of Christ.

On April 27, 1893, the Board of Regents elected Dr. William Mann Irvine, who had joined Franklin & Marshall College as an instructor after receiving his Ph.D. in political science from Princeton University in 1892 (and eventually an LL.D.), to become the headmaster at the age of 28. In July, Dr. Irvine changed the institution's name to Mercersburg Academy and began his work as the founder of the present-day preparatory school. During Dr. Irvine's tenure, three dormitories, a dining hall, gymnasium, infirmary, administration building, and the Chapel were built. A new Main Hall and Annex were constructed after a fire gutted Old Main in 1927.

After Dr. Irvine's death on June 11, 1928, Dr. Boyd Edwards was elected headmaster, where he remained until he retired in 1941. After his retirement, Dr. Charles S. Tippetts '12 resigned from a deanship at the University of Pittsburgh to become headmaster, where he remained for 20 years. During this time, Irvine Hall was completed, and the James Buchanan Cabin was moved onto the campus. His successor was William C. Fowle, who came from the Hotchkiss School in Connecticut. Fowle's tenure saw Tippetts Hall completed, Boone Hall constructed, and Ford Hall constructed. In 1969, Mercersburg again became a coeducational school.

In 1972, Walter H. Burgin Jr. '53 was appointed the school's fifth headmaster. Burgin had been a member and the chairman of Mercersburg's mathematics department from 1959 to 1964 and was teaching at Phillips Exeter Academy at his appointment. Burgin oversaw a comprehensive reshaping of the Academy's academic facilities, the building of Lenfest Hall, and integrating technology into community and classroom life.

Douglas Hale was appointed head of school in 1997, coming from Baylor School in Chattanooga, Tennessee, where he had been a teacher, assistant headmaster, and eventually headmaster since 1973. During Hale's tenure, Mercersburg's endowment grew from $64 million in 1997 to $251 million in June 2015; all dormitories were renovated with new faculty apartments; the Smoyer Tennis Center and the Davenport Squash Center were constructed; the Prentiss-Zimmerman Quad was wholly renovated in 2009; Nolde Gymnasium, the second oldest building on campus (1912), received a complete renovation in 2010—the same year that Regents' Field, the school's first synthetic-turf athletic field, was completed; the Burgin Center for the Arts was dedicated in 2006; and in 2013 the Simon Student Center was opened after a total renovation and enlargement.

Hale was succeeded in 2016 by Katherine Titus, who was the first female head of school in the Academy's history. Before coming to Mercersburg, Titus spent 11 years at St. George's School in Rhode Island, most recently as associate head for school life. She had previously worked as dean of students and assistant head for student life at St. George's, and before that, was director of college counseling at Pingree School in Massachusetts.

Quentin McDowell became Mercersburg's acting head of school in June 2021, and was appointed the Academy's eighth head of school in March 2022. McDowell has been a member of the faculty at Mercersburg since 2007, most recently serving as associate head of school for external relations; he has taught history, coached soccer, and served as head of the admission and summer programs offices.

School structure
The school now offers 170 courses and has 106 faculty members (including 77 with master's degrees and four with doctorates). Mercersburg serves grades 9–12 and postgraduate. As of the 2019–2020 school year, 442 students have enrolled: 51 percent boys and 49 percent girls. Eighty-four percent of the students are boarding students, while 16 percent are day students. The school has a 33 percent acceptance rate.

Admissions
Base tuition for the 2021–2022 school year is $64,150 for boarding students and $38,025 for day students. Fifty percent of Academy students receive financial aid (need- and merit-based). The school's total financial-aid budget is more than $7 million. Mercersburg merit scholarships include the Arce Scholarships, the Guttman Scholarship, the Hale Scholarship, the Legacy Scholarships, the Mercersburg Scholarships, the Regents Scholarships, the Witmer Scholarship, and the 1893 Scholarship.

Students come from around the world, representing 36 nations and 27 American states, and the District of Columbia. International students account for 20 percent of the student body, and 25 percent of domestic students are persons of color. 78 percent of the Mercersburg Class of 2017 was accepted by one or more colleges defined as “Most Competitive” or “Highly Competitive” by Barron's Profiles of American Colleges, with 68 percent accepted by one of U.S. News & World Report’s Top 50 National Universities or Top 50 Liberal Arts Colleges.

Endowment
The Academy has an endowment of $397 million, making it one of the highest endowment-per-student independent schools in the country. On October 10, 2013, Mercersburg alumna Deborah Simon '74 pledged $100 million to the school, making her gift the largest in the school's history and one of the largest ever to an independent secondary school in the United States.

Curriculum
Mercersburg offers 170 traditional courses, including more than 40 honors, Advanced Placement, and post-AP courses.

Honor code
Mercersburg holds its students to an honor code.

"As a member of the Mercersburg Academy community, I hereby agree to honor its standards of integrity, truth, and courage. On my honor, I pledge that I will not lie, cheat, or steal. In all my endeavors, I will work toward building trust by upholding, in spirit and letter, these community standards."

Any paper or test submitted or handed in by a student is required to have the honor code written on it: "Upon my honor, I have neither given nor received aid with this work."

Any form of violation of the honor code may result in dismissal from the institution.

Arts
Mercersburg offers curricular and extracurricular programs in theatre, choral and instrumental music, dance, and visual arts, all of which are headquartered in the school's Burgin Center for the Arts.

Extracurricular activities

Athletics

Since 2000, Mercersburg has been a member of the Mid-Atlantic Prep League (MAPL), which includes Blair Academy, The Hill School, The Hun School of Princeton, Lawrenceville School and Peddie School. Mercersburg has produced 54 Olympians in its history. Mercersburg's vaunted swimming teams most recently won the Eastern Interscholastic Swimming & Diving Championships in 2016 (girls) and 2010 (boys). The baseball team has captured several PAISAA state championships (most recently in 2008) and won or shared the MAPL title every year from 2011 to 2018; the girls' basketball team won the 2016 state championship, and the softball team earned the state title in 2012.

Alumni have competed for professional teams including the Detroit Tigers and Baltimore Orioles (MLB), Cincinnati Bengals and Pittsburgh Steelers (NFL), and Harlem Globetrotters.

The sports offered are as follows:
Fall
Men
Cross Country
Football
Golf
Soccer
Swimming
Women
Cross Country
Field Hockey
Soccer
Swimming
Tennis
Volleyball
Winter
Men
Basketball
Diving
Squash
Swimming
Track & Field (indoor)
Wrestling
Women
Basketball
Diving
Squash
Swimming
Track & Field (indoor)
Spring
Men
Baseball
Lacrosse
Swimming
Tennis
Track & Field (outdoor)
Women
Golf
Lacrosse
Softball
Swimming
Track & Field (outdoor)
Others
MOE - Mercersburg Outdoor Education
Ski Mountaineering
Downhill Ski
Rivers & Trails 
Climbing

Stony Batter Players (Theatre)
Mercersburg embraced the performing arts as early as 1899 with the formation of Stony Batter, the school's first drama group. Stony Batter was created by Camille Irvine, the wife of founding headmaster William Mann Irvine. The name “Stony Batter” was adopted in honor of the place near campus where U.S. President James Buchanan was born. Today the group is known as Stony Batter Players. Recent productions have included Fiddler on the Roof, Mamma Mia!, Proof, The Real Inspector Hound, Chicago, The Diary of Anne Frank, Antigone: An Apocalypse, Legally Blonde: The Musical, Urinetown, Mere Mortals, The Caucasian Chalk Circle, World War Z, and Lend Me A Tenor, among others. In the spring, Stony Batter typically performs scenes from the classical or Shakespearean repertoire or a modern “10-Minute Play Festival.” Hollywood legend and Oscar-winner Jimmy Stewart '28 performed in Stony Batter productions while a student at Mercersburg.

Dance
Before 2003, the school showcased official dance recitals, musical theatre performances, and a dance troupe called Storm Front that performed during halftime of home football games—but all of these activities were extracurricular. In 2003, dance formally entered the Mercersburg curriculum. The program came into its own in 2006 with the Burgin Center for the Arts and its two large, dedicated dance studios (the first in the school's history). Today's crux of the dance program focuses on dance technique at various levels, including ballet, modern, jazz, tap, yoga, and strength training. The curriculum also includes three levels of dance composition. Two formal concerts are presented each year, in the fall and spring.

Visual arts
Mercersburg's studio arts curriculum includes media ranging from ceramics to digital video art, sculpture, painting, and drawing. Student artwork is displayed in the Burgin Center for the Arts and across the campus. In recent years, 11 students have captured awards in the annual Mid-Atlantic Prep League Art Exhibition. Five students had their work exhibited at the National K12 Ceramic Exhibition (considered to be the foremost juried ceramic competition for students in the U.S.).

Music
Music played an integral role at Mercersburg practically from the beginning. Dr. Irvine led the Mercersburg Academy Glee Club for several years, and in 1901 he published The Mercersburg Academy Song Book.

The Octet, the boys' a cappella group organized in 1947, performs at least three times each year. The Glee Club preceded the Octet and was the school's premier musical group for decades until it disbanded in 1976—a reflection of Mercersburg's then-new coed status—after which emerged the Mercersburg Chorale, a mixed chorus for boys and girls, and Magalia, the girls' a cappella group. Both ensembles are very active today. The Chapel Choir has existed since the building of the Irvine Memorial Chapel in 1926. Today the choirs perform at major school events, such as Convocation and Baccalaureate, in addition to occasional services in the Chapel and elsewhere in the Mid-Atlantic region.

Students interested in instrumental music can perform in the Mercersburg Jazz Band, Concert Band, or the String Ensemble. The school offers private music lessons through teachers from the Cumberland Valley School of Music or private studios for an additional fee.

School traditions
The Washington Irving Literary Society and John Marshall Literary Society—the school's oldest student organizations—trace their roots back before Mercersburg Academy was established. Before Marshall College moved to Lancaster to become Franklin & Marshall College, its students created the Diagnothian and Goethean literary societies. In 1865, after the founding of Mercersburg College, the Washington Irving Literary Society was born; within a year, the rival John Marshall Literary Society emerged. William Mann Irvine helped revive the two societies at the Academy's founding, and the rival societies have competed against one another ever since. All students attending Mercersburg are members of one of the two societies; those with family members who preceded them at the school can choose to represent the same society. Otherwise, society officers meet early in the school year to select new students for each group. (This replaces the early practice of returning students racing to meet stagecoaches carrying new students to campus in hopes of convincing those students to join a particular society.)

What began as a midwinter debate competition has evolved into a week of intense competition in everything from basketball and swimming to chess and poker. The climactic event of the week is Declamation, a speaking contest where five representatives from each society deliver prepared monologues. Winners of each event during the week earn points for their respective societies, with the largest number of points awarded at Declamation. The winning society claims bragging rights for the next 12 months.

Each year, on the Friday evening of Alumni Weekend (often held in October), students gather on the steps of Main Hall for Step Songs, which involves the singing of school songs and traditional cheers as a pep rally for the next day's athletic contests, usually against a Mid-Atlantic Prep League opponent. The tradition evolved into its present form from that of an annual concert given for visiting alumni by the Glee Club—under the direction of Headmaster Irvine. (Irvine suffered a stroke during Step Songs in 1928 and died a week later.)

In a tradition known as "Painting the Numbers," the school seniors gather late one night each fall to paint the school's Academy Drive entrance with their class year. The paint often stays visible until the following fall.

Mercersburg holds its commencement exercises outdoors on a raised graduation platform of grass and stone between South Cottage and Keil Hall. It is a tradition for students to avoid setting foot on the platform their entire academic careers before commencement day. Graduates do not wear traditional caps and gowns to the ceremony; instead, girls wear white dresses, and boys wear coats and ties. The class valedictorian receives his/her diploma first. In contrast, two class marshals (elected by members of the class) and the senior-class president are the final students to be announced as graduates. A baccalaureate ceremony is held in the Irvine Memorial Chapel the evening before commencement.

Summer programs
In the summer months, Mercersburg offers several camps and programs about enrichment, encouraging personal growth, and fun. Each summer, participants ages 7–17 take part in various programs, ranging from the Adventure Camp series to various academic, arts, and sports camps. Some of the offerings include Young Writers Camp, Performing Arts Intensive, STEAM Camp, and clinics in the sports of swimming, basketball, soccer, and more.

Additionally, Mercersburg offers ESL+, an immersive five-week program for international students to polish their English fluency and experience American culture in a residential setting. Participants live in dormitories and take frequent trips throughout the Mid-Atlantic in addition to classroom time and social experiences.

Campus
Mercersburg's 300-acre campus includes seven student residences and three main academic buildings housing 47 classrooms and labs; 10 playing fields (including a synthetic turf field); a gymnasium complex; a tennis center; a squash center; an outdoor track; and a 65,500-square-foot arts center. 
Main Hall was first constructed in 1837 but was demolished in a fire in 1927. It was rebuilt that year and opened in 1928. Main Hall was an original building on campus and has been used as a dormitory and classroom space. It was renovated in 1998, and today it is exclusively a boys' dormitory. 
Traylor Hall, completed in 1922, is home to the Head of School's Office, the Office of Admission and Financial Aid, the Business Office, and the Office of Summer Programs. 
The Irvine Memorial Chapel was built in 1926 under the supervision and planning of Dr. William Mann Irvine by architect Ralph Adams Cram. The Chapel was designed in Gothic style and houses a large pipe organ and a traditional carillon in its tower.
Lenfest Hall is named for alumnus H. F. "Gerry" Lenfest '49 (a former president of Mercersburg's Board of Regents). Its contemporary design was intended to mirror the Irvine Memorial Chapel, which sits on the opposite side of the school's Prentiss-Zimmerman Quadrangle. Dedicated in 1993, Lenfest Hall includes the school's library (which houses 24,000 volumes and a significant collection of digital assets); classrooms and offices for the history department; and the school archives.
Irvine Hall is a four-story classroom building; it was initially dedicated in 1949 and completely renovated in 1993. The building houses the office of the Academic Dean; classrooms and offices for the mathematics, science, and classical and modern languages departments; and the headquarters for the Office of Informational Technology, as well as the Sheridan Gallery, which houses works that are part of the school's permanent collection and is also used as a classroom.
Nolde Gymnasium was built in 1912; it has seen numerous expansions and received a complete renovation in 2010. It is part of the Goldthorpe Athletic Complex, which also contains the Plantz Courts (1968), the Wrestling Center (1998), the McDowell Fitness Center (1998), the Davenport Squash Center (2004), the Hale Field House (2017), and the Lloyd Aquatic Center with the 50-meter Furnary Pool (2019). The Smoyer Tennis Center (2001) and the synthetic turf Regents' Field (2009), and numerous other playing fields are part of the total athletic center but set apart from Goldthorpe.
Rutledge Hall includes classrooms and offices for the English department and is connected to Keil Hall, a historic dormitory that houses the Edwards Room—which has at various times in the school's history served as a library, dining room, performance space, and student lounge. It includes 36 Tiffany windows adorned with some of the names of colleges and universities attended by Mercersburg students at the time of its dedication in 1900.
The Burgin Center for the Arts opened in 2006 and houses all aspects of the school's performing and visual arts curriculum. It stands on the former site of Boone Hall (the school's previous auditorium). The entire building is 65,500 square feet (6,090 m2) and includes theatres, dance studios, gallery spaces, visual-art labs and studios, a scene shop, classroom space, and offices for the fine arts department.
Ford Hall was built in 1965 and is the school's dining hall. The Academy maintains its tradition of serving meals family-style. The hall is named in honor of Edward E. Ford '12, the E.E. Ford Foundation namesake, which provided funds for the building. The Jimmy Walker and Jane Ford lounges on the upper level of the building and the hall's main entrance were completely renovated in 2013.
The Simon Student Center, located on the lower level of Ford Hall, opened in 2013 after a total renovation and enlargement. It includes a large, circular student lounge with a small thrust stage for live performances; a cafe; a theatre-style HDTV room and game tables; an expanded school store and post office; meeting space for student clubs and organizations; and a handful of administrative offices.
The Masinter Outdoor Education Center was built in 2004 through a contribution from Edgar Masinter '48, a former president of Mercersburg's Board of Regents. It houses a 30-foot climbing wall for Mercersburg Outdoor Education (MOE) and Mercersburg Summer and Extended Programs and was created by a 10,000-square-foot timber-frame barn.
What is now the Prentiss Alumni and Parent Center at North Cottage once housed Mercersburg's head of school and family. While the head of school's family now resides across the street in 1893 House (opened in 2013), North Cottage includes guest rooms and a welcome center for alumni and visitors. A 2016 addition created a workspace for Mercersburg's Office of Advancement and Alumni Relations and Strategic Marketing and Communications Office.
The Class of 1938 Observatory was given to the school as the 60th reunion gift of class members and has been in use since 2003.
The McFadden Model Railroad Museum is a collection of model trains resulting from merging two significant collections and other minor donations. The John B. McFadden collection includes many items manufactured by the Lionel Train Company, dating from the pre-Depression years to the 1970s. The collection was given a home at the Academy in 1973. It included at least 80 engines, as many as 200 pieces of rolling stock, and more than 200 feet of operating track. 
The James Buchanan Cabin (believed to be the birthplace of the first Pennsylvanian to be elected president of the United States) was originally located at Stony Batter, an early trading post about 2.5 miles west of campus, and was erected sometime before 1791. It was moved to Chambersburg, Pennsylvania, where it served various uses. To ensure that the cabin would be adequately stored and maintained, the school purchased it in 1953 and placed it near Nolde Gymnasium on campus.

Burgin Center for the Arts
Standing on the former site of Boone Hall, the Burgin Center for the Arts opened in the fall of 2006, providing dedicated space to house the school's entire theatre, music, dance, and visual arts curriculum. The 65,500-square-foot facility is named for alumnus and former headmaster Walter Burgin '53 and his wife, Barbara. Designed by Polshek Partnership, the Burgin Center hosts concerts, theatre productions, guest speakers, and all-school meetings. Violinist Itzhak Perlman performed at the building's opening gala.

The Burgin Center houses:
A 600-seat proscenium stage (Simon Theatre)
A 120-seat studio “black box” theatre (Hale Studio Theatre)
Two gallery spaces
Two recital/rehearsal halls
Two dance studios
A digital art lab 
A digital music lab
Four art studios, including a drawing studio, a painting studio, a sculpture studio, and a ceramics studio
A scene shop
An acting studio and a general arts classroom
Several practice rooms and faculty offices

The Carillon and Organ

The Swoope Carillon in Barker Tower of the Irvine Memorial Chapel is one of 163 traditional carillons in the United States. A gift of Mr. Henry B. Swoope, the original 43 bronze bells were cast in 1926 by the English firm of Gillett and Johnston of Croydon. The bells contain bits of historic metal collected worldwide by alumni and friends of the school, including copper coins, metal from Old Ironsides, pieces of artillery shells gathered from the fields of France in World War I, a shaving from the Liberty Bell, and bits from Admiral Nelson's flagship at Trafalgar, HMS Victory. The tower is named for Bryan Barker, the school's carillonneur for more than 50 years.

Six additional upper bells were added in 1996. The 50th bell—a low C#—was added in 2008 and dedicated to Barker's successor as carillonneur, James W. Smith. With the whole school assembled to watch, the 50th bell was lifted into place in May 2008, and it was first played by Smith a few days later after the mechanics had been put in place. Smith served as carillonneur from 1981 until he died in 2009.

The Chapel organ was a gift of Mr. and Mrs. George A. Wood. Built by the Skinner Organ Company of Boston in 1925, the organ has 55 stops, about 4,000 pipes, 27 couplers, and 33 adjustable combination pistons.

Boys' dormitories
Keil Hall – located above the historic Edwards Room and Rutledge Hall (home to the English Department) and offered to 11th and 12th-grade boarders.
Main Hall – the original dorm and first building constructed as part of the school and offered to 10th, 11th, and 12th-grade boarders.
Tippetts Hall – has three floors with one wing reserved for ninth graders; home to all ninth-grade boarding boys and some 10th, 11th, and 12th graders.

Girls' dormitories
Fowle Hall – home to all ninth and 10th-grade boarding girls, as well as some 11th and 12th-grade boarders.
South Cottage – one of the oldest buildings on campus; used as a hospital for wounded soldiers during the Civil War. Part of its roof was blown off during Hurricane Sandy in 2012. Offered to 11th- and 12th-grade boarders.
Swank Hall – formerly a boys’ dorm known as the Main Annex. Offered to 11th- and 12th-grade boarders.
Culbertson House – a freestanding home on campus that houses ten students and a separate faculty family apartment. It was changed from a boys’ dorm to a girls’ dorm in 2018 and offered to 10th, 11th- and 12th-grade boarders.

All dormitories were completely renovated in the 1990s and early 2000s and are air-conditioned and fully wired with wireless and Ethernet connections; each dorm is also home to several faculty members and their families.

Notable alumni
Mercersburg has produced many notable individuals, including 54 Olympians (who have won 12 gold medals), seven Rhodes Scholars, several Fulbright Scholars, a Nobel Prize winner, two Academy Award winners, and two Emmy Award winners.

Medal of Honor recipients
Joel Thompson Boone, United States Navy officer and physician
Eugene B. Fluckey, United States Navy officer
Ralph Talbot, United States Marine Corps aviator

Nobel Prize recipient
Burton Richter, physicist

Olympic gold medalists
Bill Carr 1929 - athletics, 400m and 4 × 400 m relay, 1932 Summer Olympics
Harry Glancy 1924 - swimming, 4 × 200 m freestyle relay, 1924 Summer Olympics
Robert Leavitt 1903 - athletics, 110m hurdles, 1906 Summer Olympics
Ted Meredith 1912 - athletics, 800m and 4 × 400 m relay, 1912 Summer Olympics
Betsy Mitchell 1983 - swimming, 4 × 100 m medley relay, 1984 Summer Olympics
Charles Moore Jr. 1947 - athletics, 400m hurdles and 4 × 400 m relay, 1952 Summer Olympics
Richard Saeger 1982 - swimming, 4 × 200 m freestyle relay, 1984 Summer Olympics
Melvin Stewart 1988 - swimming, 200m butterfly and 4 × 100 m medley relay, 1992 Summer Olympics
Allen Woodring 1918 - athletics, 200m, 1920 Summer Olympics

Academy Award winners 
Benicio del Toro, actor known for Traffic , The Usual Suspects, 21 Grams, and Che
James Stewart, actor known for The Philadelphia Story, It's a Wonderful Life, and Mr. Smith Goes to Washington

Rhodes scholars 
Cresson H. Kearny, military officer and author
James M. Tunnell, lawyer, politician, and jurist

Academics
Ann M. Blair, Carl H. Pforzheimer University Professor of History at Harvard University; 2002 MacArthur Fellows Program recipient

Arts and literature
Bill Baldwin, science-fiction author known for The Helmsman series
Luke Ebbin, composer and Grammy-nominated record producer
Walker Evans, photographer
Walter Farley, author known for The Black Stallion series
William Seabrook, journalist, world traveler,and occultist

Business
Joe L. Brown, general manager of the Pittsburgh Pirates
Dick Cass, president of the Baltimore Ravens (National Football League)
Jim Irsay, owner of the Indianapolis Colts
Gerry Lenfest, founder of Suburban Cable (sold to Comcast in 2000) and member of the Forbes 400
Nicholas Taubman, CEO of Advance Auto Parts
Dean Taylor, baseball executive/general manager of the Milwaukee Brewers
Steven Zhang, chairman of the Inter Milan football club

Government and politics
Nancy Abudu, lawyer and judicial nominee
Stewart H. Appleby, United States representative from New Jersey's 3rd congressional district
John Coolidge, businessman and son of President Calvin Coolidge
León Febres Cordero, president of Ecuador
Harry Hughes, 57th Governor of Maryland
Charles Alvin Jones, judge of the United States Court of Appeals for the Third Circuit; chief justice of the Supreme Court of Pennsylvania
John E. Jones III, judge of the United States District Court for the Middle District of Pennsylvania who decided the Kitzmiller v. Dover Area School District
James N. Robertson, Pennsylvania State Representative for Delaware County
Nicholas Taubman, United States ambassador to Romania 
Dick Thornburgh, 41st governor of Pennsylvania and United States attorney general

Journalism
Rebecca Lowe, TV sportscaster for NBC (formerly with ESPN UK, the BBC, and Setanta Sports)

Military 
Wilbert Wallace White, decorated World War I flying ace

Performing arts 
Vanessa Branch, actress known for Pirates of the Caribbean, Orbit Gum commercials; Miss Vermont 1994
Michael Davies, executive producer of Who Wants to Be a Millionaire?, Wife Swap, Power of 10, and Men in Blazers
William Davies, screenwriter known for Flushed Away, Twins, Grumpy Old Men
Sean Kanan, actor known for The Karate Kid Part III, General Hospital, The Bold and the Beautiful
Emily Maynard, winner of The Bachelor and star of The Bachelorette
Ben Mendelsohn, actor known for Bloodline, The Dark Knight Rises, Mississippi Grind, "Captain Marvel (film)", and "Secret Invasion (TV series)".
John Payne, actor known for Miracle on 34th Street, Sentimental Journey, and many other movie and TV roles

Sports
Joe Birmingham, Major League Baseball player; first manager of the Cleveland Indians
Bob Books, American football player, Frankford Yellow Jackets (NFL)
Josh Edgin, pitcher for the New York Mets
Bump Hadley, major-league pitcher and Boston Red Sox television broadcaster
Roy Lechthaler, American football player for the Philadelphia Eagles
Stéphane Pelle, Cameroonian professional basketball player
Vincent Rey, linebacker for the Cincinnati Bengals
Mark Talbott, inducted into the United States Squash Hall of Fame in 2000
Jack Taylor, holder of the NCAA basketball single-game scoring record (138 points)

References

External links

 
National Center for Education Statistics data for Mercersburg Academy
The Association of Boarding Schools profile
Time magazine story on First Lady Coolidge's laying of Irvine Memorial Chapel cornerstone at the Academy

School buildings on the National Register of Historic Places in Pennsylvania
High schools in Central Pennsylvania
Private high schools in Pennsylvania
Boarding schools in Pennsylvania
Educational institutions established in 1893
Schools in Franklin County, Pennsylvania
Ralph Adams Cram church buildings
1893 establishments in Pennsylvania
Historic districts on the National Register of Historic Places in Pennsylvania
National Register of Historic Places in Franklin County, Pennsylvania